Plougar is a commune in the Finistère department of Brittany in north-western France.

Population
Inhabitants of Plougar are called in French Plougarois.

See also
Communes of the Finistère department
Yann Larhantec

References

External links

Mayors of Finistère Association 

Communes of Finistère